Cyperus pseudopetiolatus is a species of sedge that is native to parts of eastern Brazil.

See also 
 List of Cyperus species

References 

pseudopetiolatus
Plants described in 2007
Flora of Brazil